The 2014–15 Hawaii Rainbow Warriors basketball team represented the University of Hawaii at Manoa during the 2014–15 NCAA Division I men's basketball season. The Rainbow Warriors, led by interim head coach Benjy Taylor, played their home games at the Stan Sheriff Center as members of the Big West Conference. On October 28, 2014, Gib Arnold was removed as coach at Hawaii following an NCAA investigation. Assistant Benjy Taylor was named interim head coach. Despite a 22 win season and being the runner up in their conference tournament, the Warriors didn't play in a postseason tournament. Taylor was not retained after the season.

Roster

Schedule and results
Source: 

|-
!colspan=9 style="background:#004231; color:white;"| Exhibition

|-
!colspan=9 style="background:#004231; color:white;"| Non-conference games

|-
!colspan=9 style="background:#004231; color:white;"| Conference games

|-
!colspan=9 style="background:#004231; color:white;"| Big West tournament

References

Hawaii Rainbow Warriors basketball seasons
Hawai'i
2014 in sports in Hawaii
Rain